Ellen Hall (born Ellen Joanna Johnson, April 18, 1923 – March 24, 1999) was an American actress.

Hall achieved fame as an American B-movie actress of the 1940s and early 1950s.  Early in her career, her attractiveness opened doors to becoming one of the members of the famed Goldwyn Girls in 1943. Later on, she played mostly supporting roles in the popular Westerns of the period.  She also acted in several family-oriented comedies and musicals.  She retired from movies and television in 1952.

Life and career

Early Years
Hall's mother was silent film actress Ella Hall.  Her father was actor turned director Emory Johnson. She spent most of her life in Los Angeles.  By 1924, Ellen's mother had filed for divorce.  Her parents reconciled in late 1925; then tragedy struck in March 1926. While Ella and the kids were crossing a busy street in Hollywood, Ellen's 5-year-old brother Alfred was struck and killed by a truck.  The accident fueled another reconciliation. Then to strengthen their new bond, Ella and Emory decided to have one last child. Ellen's only sister, Diana Marie, was born in October 1929.

In 1930, frequent fence-mending between Ella and Emory Johnson was over and their divorce decree was finalized. Ella and her three children moved in with Ella's mother.  Ella's mother, Mary Hall, lived in an unassuming Spanish stucco in North Hollywood.  To support her three children, Ella started a new sales job at the upscale ladies dress shop – I. Magnin, located on Hollywood Boulevard. Ella's job paid well and the kids had a comfortable upbringing. Their father filed for bankruptcy in 1932.  Ella spent time in court contesting support payments.  This acrimony probably contributed to the children's estrangement from their father.

Movie career
Hall's first role in a movie is listed as a young girl in All Quiet on the Western Front.  Hall was seven when she got the role.  The book The Encyclopedia of Feature Players of Hollywood, Volume 1, contains an interview with Hall's brother Richard Emory, in which her brother recalled a small part he had in the movie, their mother's Ella Hall part playing an uncredited nurse and makes no mention of Hall even being on the set.  None of these assertions can be verified. Her brother's recollections were forty years after the fact.

  In 1941, Hall turned 18 years old and made her cinematic debut.  She managed to get an uncredited part in the musical The Chocolate Soldier. starring Nelson Eddy. Her film career included parts in several musicals. In the latter part of 1943, the 21-year-old Hall became of one of the thirty-four glamorous Goldwyn girls scoring a part in the musical Up in Arms starring Danny Kaye and Dinah Shore. Her promotional photo from the shoot states - "She is 5'6" tall, weighs 123 pounds, has brown hair and blue eyes."  The film was released in February 1944.  Again in 1944, she worked with Bing Crosby and Betty Hutton in Here Come the Waves. In 1945, she was again a Goldwyn girl in the musical production of the Wonder Man starring Danny Kaye and Virginia Mayo. In 1946, another musical came along in the form of the Busby Berkeley production of Cinderella Jones starring Robert Alda and Joan Leslie.

Although she found work in a variety of genres, she found her acting niche in B movie westerns. Hall got her first female lead in 1943 Monogram Picture's production of Outlaws of the Stampede starring Johnny Mack Brown and Raymond Hatton. In early 1944, she got top female billing again in another Johnny Mack Brown Western, Monogram Picture's of Raiders of the Border.  She made a third Johnny Mack Brown Western in latter 1944, Range Law. She then saddled up for another 1944 production, with top female billing in the fifty-third Hopalong Cassidy film, Lumberjack, starring William Boyd as Hopalong Cassidy.  Her last top female role in a 1944 Western productions included Brand of the Devil and Republic Pictures Call of the Rockies, starring  Sunset Carson and Smiley Burnette. Fewer Westerns roles followed her 1944 marriage and other film commitments. In 1946, she gained the female lead in Thunder Town starring Bob Steele. In 1949, she starred opposite Jimmy Wakely in the Lawless Code.  This film was her last role in a western movie.

Interspersed with her 1944 Western roles, she also managed to land a role as the long-dead wife of Bela Lugosi in the forgettable production of Voodoo Man.  The movie also featured John Carradine.

Hall found work on a television series in the early 1950s.  She appeared in three episodes of The Cisco Kid. Coincidentally, while she was working on The Cisco Kid, her brother Richard Emory was in the early stages of his acting career and found work in the same television series.

Hall's last Hollywood film was the 1951 production of the Bowery Battalion featuring The Bowery Boys. In 1952, she retired from making films.  She was 29 years old.

Marriage
In February 1944, actress Ann Sheridan was working on her role as Nora Bayes in the movie Shine On, Harvest Moon. Hall was assisting Sheridan while she was working on the song. While on the movie set, Sheridan introduced Hall to Marine fighter pilot Captain Lee Langer. Captain Langer had seen action in the 1942 battle of Guadalcanal.  Hall and Langer immediately connected and then adopted the song that "belongs to them", Shine on Harvest Moon.  In March 1944, they announced their engagement. They planned an early marriage, but ended up waiting almost a year.

On a Sunday afternoon in December 1944, they married at the Hollywood home of Frances Marion.  Since Hall was a Goldwyn girl, it made sense to have a "Diamond Horseshoe" girl, Rickie VanDusen, as her maid of honor. Hall's mother considered Mary Pickford a good friend.  At the reception following the wedding, Pickford was in the receiving line. A newspaper article describing the wedding referenced her father as "The late Emory Johnson." Father and daughter were estranged at the time. Hall was 21 at the time of her marriage.

Post movies
After her 1944 marriage, she acted in six more movies and appeared in three episodes of The Cisco Kid. By 1952 she had retired from films. The couple moved to a quiet cul-de-sac in Woodland Hills, Los Angeles.  She devoted herself to raising her son and local volunteer work. She was a member of the Motion Picture and Television Relief Fund's volunteer group.  She served as its volunteer president from 1969 to 1970. She was also a member of the Women's Club of the Desert met regularly at the Palm Desert Country Club.

Her husband became a Hollywood restaurateur. He managed the upscale restaurant Encore Cafe, located on La Cienega Boulevard in North Hollywood. The restaurant was one of the many upscale diners located on La Cienega Boulevard in an area that became Hollywood's "Restaurant Row." In 1951, he also became a Major in the Marine Reserves.

Death
After living in Los Angeles, the couple retired to Rosarito Beach, Mexico. Langer died in San Ysidro, San Diego, California at the age of 76 after he and Hall had been married for 50 years. After his death, Hall moved to Bellevue, Nebraska to be closer to her son. On March 24, 1999, Ellen Hall died of complications from a stroke while residing at the Hillcrest Care and Rehabilitation Center in Bellevue. A private service was held for her in Bellevue. Her ashes were interred with her mother and sister at Forest Lawn Memorial Park in Glendale, California. Her estranged father is interred a block away.  Ellen Hall Langer was 75 at the time of her death.

Filmography

Television

References

External links

 
 
 
 
 Those obscure objects of desire - Ellen Hall

Actresses from Los Angeles
American television actresses
American film actresses
1922 births
1999 deaths
Burials at Forest Lawn Memorial Park (Glendale)
20th-century American actresses
People from Bellevue, Nebraska